The African Rally for Progress and National Solidarity (RAP) was a political party in Benin.

History
The party contested the 1995 parliamentary elections as part of the informal Presidential Tendency alliance, which supported President Nicéphore Soglo. It received 2.6% of the vote, winning a single seat, taken by Rigobert Ladikpo.

References

Defunct political parties in Benin